Inese Lībiņa-Egnere (born 25 September 1977) is a Latvian politician representing the Unity party. She was a member and Deputy Speaker of the 11th Saeima (elected from Reform Party). She was the Deputy Speaker and the Chairperson of the National Security Committee of the 12th Saeima. 
In 2022, Lībiņa-Egnere was elected in the 14th Saeima. Currently she is the Latvian Minister of Justice.

Early life and career
Lībiņa-Egnere was born on 25 September 1977 in Riga. She completed her secondary education in Liepaja Secondary School No5 in 1996. Higher education was gained in the Faculty of Law at the University of Latvia and afterwards at the University of Freiburg in Germany.

She became a member of a law firm "Liepa, Skopiņa/BORENIUS". Since 2004, she has been a lecturer – Assistant Professor at the Department of Civil Law, University of Latvia. In 2007, she completed her doctoral studies and gained a Doctor in Law at the University of Latvia. From 2007 to 2011 she was the legal advisor to the President of the Republic of Latvia Valdis Zatlers.

Political activities

In 2011 Lībiņa-Egnere joined Zatlers` Reform Party. As a party list candidate for the 11th Parliamentary elections, she was elected from the Courland region. She became a member of the Legal Affairs Committee and the European Affairs Committee. Since 20 October 2011 has been the Deputy Chairperson of the Legal Affairs Committee. On 14 June 2012 she was elected the Deputy Speaker of the Saeima.

In May 2014, together with a group of deputies and ministers from the Reform Party, Lībiņa-Egnere joined the political party Unity, from which she was elected in the 12th Saeima. Currently is the Deputy Speaker of the Saeima, Chairperson of the National Security Committee, the Deputy Chairperson of the Legal Affairs Committee, and the Chairperson of Judicial Policy Subcommittee of the Legal Affairs Committee.

In addition to her role in parliament, Lībiņa-Egnere has been serving as the head of the Latvian delegation to the Parliamentary Assembly of the Council of Europe. As member of the Assembly, she currently is the chairwoman of the Sub-Committee on Human Rights. She also serves as a member of the Committee on Legal Affairs and Human Rights; the Committee on the Honouring of Obligations and Commitments by Member States of the Council of Europe (Monitoring Committee); the Committee on the Election of Judges to the European Court of Human Rights; the Sub-Committee on the implementation of judgments of the European Court of Human Rights. In this capacity, she has been the Assembly’s co-rapporteur on the situation in Moldova since 2021.

References

External links

 CVK profils
 Saeimas profils

1977 births
Living people
Politicians from Riga
Lawyers from Riga
Reform Party (Latvia) politicians
New Unity politicians
Deputies of the 11th Saeima
Deputies of the 12th Saeima
Deputies of the 13th Saeima
Deputies of the 14th Saeima
21st-century Latvian women politicians
Latvian women lawyers
21st-century women lawyers
20th-century Latvian lawyers
21st-century Latvian lawyers
University of Latvia alumni
University of Freiburg alumni
Academic staff of the University of Latvia
Women deputies of the Saeima